Ralph de Limesy (alias de Limesi) lord of the manor of Limésy in Normandy (now a commune in the Seine-Maritime department in the Normandy region in northern France) was a Domesday Book Anglo-Norman magnate and tenant-in-chief of King William the Conqueror. According to Camden: "At the time of the General Survey made by King William the Conqueror, Ralph de Limesi had great possessions in this Realm; viz. in Devonshire four lordships, in Somersetshire seven, in Essex three, in Norfolk two, in Suffolk eleven, in Northamptonshire one, in Warwickshire one, in Hertfordshire four, and in Notinghamshire eight".

Origins
The Duchess of Cleveland (1819-1901) wrote as follows concerning the family of Linnebey in her "Battle Abbey Roll with some Account of the Norman Lineages" (1889)
"Leland here once more comes to our assistance, for he gives this and the following name as "Lymesay et Latymer." It appears in another part of Duchesne's copy under its Scottish form of Lindsay. Lord Lindsay tells us that "the names Lindesay and Limesay are identical, both of them implying 'Isle of Lime-trees,' and are frequently interchanged, and applied to the same individuals, not merely in the heraldic MSS. of two hundred years ago, but in ancient public records, and in the early transcripts of Battle Abbey Roll.

"The original Norman Sires de Limesay were seated at the place so called in the Pays de Caux, near Pavilly, fives leagues N.W. of Rouen. They flourished for many generations after the Conquest, and failed apparently shortly after the middle of the thirteenth century, when the Sires de Frontebosc, a younger branch, succeeded to the property. Their descendants in the female line, Comtes de Frontebosc and Marquesses de Limesay, flourished till the French Revolution, and still, I believe, exist. Randolph de Limesay, said to have been sister's son to the Conqueror, was the first of the Anglo-Norman stock who settled in England. He obtained above forty lordships in different counties of England, including Wolverley in Warwickshire, the chief seat of his posterity, and from which they took their style as barons. There was but little of the castle remaining in Dugdale's time, save the moat, and certain 'great banks, whereon ancient trees do grow,' coeval probably with the first arrival of the Normans. Randolph died towards the close of William the Conqueror's reign, after founding the Priory of Hertford, in dependency of the Abbey of St. Albans, within whose hallowed precincts he and his wife Hadewisia were admitted as brother and sister before their decease. Alan de Limesay, his son, and Gerard, his grandson, succeeded him, and were similarly bountiful, but the son of Gerard dying without issue, the property went to his two daughters, Basilia, wife of Sir Hugh de Odingsels, and Aleonora, wife of Sir David de Lindsay of Crawford."

The husband selected for the younger co-heiress of the barony of Wolverley was of her own blood, being the descendant of Walter de Lindesay, who first settled in Scotland under the banner of David I. He figures repeatedly in the charters of the latter while Prince of Cumberland; and "is a witness and juror in the celebrated Inquisitio or inquest of Prince David into the possessions and rights of the see of Glasgow within his territories, in 1116." His exact relationship to the English Limesays is not known; but it is certain that for many generations his posterity bore the same arms—Gules, an eagle displayed Or. They resided at Ercildoune in Roxburghshire—in after times the home of Thomas the Rhymer; but from the latter part of the twelfth century we find them associated with the great mountain territory of Crawford—commonly called Crawford-Lindsay—in Clydesdale, "so inseparably connected with their later history." Sir David, High Justiciary of Scotland, who married his English kinswoman in 1201, was the son of a Scottish princess, Marjory, sister of King William the Lion and David Earl of Huntingdon; and as all his four sons died without issue, the descendant of his only daughter, Alice de Pinkeney, claimed the Crown of Scotland at the competition in 1292. Sir David himself was the elder of three brothers. Sir Walter, the second, founded the house of Lamberton, of which four successive generations married heiresses, till Christiana de Lindesay, representing the last of the line, carried its accumulated riches to her husband Ingelram de Guisnes, Sire de Coucy. Thus the descendants of the third brother, William, who had the barony of Luffness, in East Lothian, as his appanage, became the heads of the house, and eventually recovered the hereditary estates. "Even before the death of Sir Henry Pinkeney in 1301, Crawford and its dependencies had been seized and declared forfeit by the Scottish authorities, and bestowed on Sir Alexander Lindsay of Luffness, who sat as one of the great barons in the Parliament of 1308-9, which acknowledged Robert Bruce as lawful King of Scotland." From his son, David, also a faithful adherent of Bruce, and the

"Schir Dawy the Lyndyssay,
That was true and of stedfast fay—"

descend the greater part of the twenty distinct branches of the family—one of them settled in the United States of America—that are enumerated in the pedigree given in the Lives of the Lindsays[84] and were for the most part extinguished during the great civil war. His grandson and namesake was created Earl of Crawford in 1398: "the Earldom of Crawford being the third created since the extinction of the Celtic dynasty; that of Douglas having been the second, and that of Moray the first." Another branch were Lords Lindsay of the Byres, and Earls of Lindsay, the most powerful cadet of the house; a third Earls of Balcarres; a fourth Lords Spynie; and a fifth gave birth to the famous poet and herald, who was sent as ambassador to the Emperor Charles V. by James V.

"Still is thy name of high account,
And still thy verse has charms,
Sir David Lindsay of the Mount,
Lord Lion-King-at-Arms."

It would be idle for me to attempt to trace out the varied and romantic fortunes of this renowned family, whose annals, written by a former head of the house, fill three interesting volumes; the briefest summary is all my space admits of. There have been in all twenty-six Earls of Crawford of this name. They had their castle at Finhaven in Angus, and held their great fief with rights of regality that ensured them "at least as many of the privileges of an independent prince as a Margrave or Pfalzgrave." For many successive generations they were hereditary Sheriffs of Aberdeen and Forfar. One of them was the fierce Tiger Earl—Earl Beardie—whom tradition believes to be still playing at "the de'il's buiks" in the secret chamber at Glamis Castle; "doomed to play there till the end of time;" and nightly issuing forth, as each month of November comes round, to prowl about the house, and bend over the beds of its inmates, startled from their sleep as his long beard sweeps across their faces. Another, the fifth Earl, "under whom the Lindsays rose to their highest power in Scotland," was created Duke of Montrose by James III. in 1488, having "deserved nobly of him" for loyalty and devotion: but at his death the Dukedom sank into dormancy, and was unsuccessfully claimed only a few years ago by the late Earl. Another had to appeal to the Crown in 1526 for protection against his own son, who laid violent hands upon him, and imprisoned him in his own dungeon at Finhaven, pillaging his writs and appropriating his rents. By the Scottish law the "Wicked Master" (as he was justly called) thus incurred the guilt of parricide, and entailed a curse on all his descendants, who seemed "hereditarily doomed to prodigality and crime." Accordingly, one of them, the Comes Incarceratus, died in duresse in Edinburgh Castle, leaving his only child, Lady Jean, literally a beggar for her daily bread. During the Thirty Years' War, "six young Crawford cousins," Earl George, with his brothers and kinsmen, took service under Gustavus Adolphus; and the younger of these brothers, Ludovic, the "Loyal Earl," was among the first to join Charles I. at the rearing of the standard at Nottingham, and died an exile for his sake. His Earldom was declared forfeit, and granted by the Covenanters to John, first Earl of Lindsay, and tenth Lord Lindsay of the Byres, who had espoused their cause, and was at the same time appointed High Treasurer; and with his posterity it remained till the line failed with the twenty-second Earl in 1808. It then passed to Alexander, sixth Earl of Balcarres (descended from a second son of the ninth Earl); but "he was," says his grandson, "unwilling to assume the title or advance his pretensions, owing to the difficulty of dealing with such a mass of intermediate pedigree and extinctions, and to the uncertainty which existed as to the ultimate remainder or limitation in the patent of 1642:" by which Charles I. had reconferred the title on Earl Ludovic. He consequently never bore it; but the discovery of that document in the charter-room at Crawford Priory, in 1833, enabled his successor to make good his claim, which was confirmed in 1848 by the decision of the House of Lords.

Further reading
Linzee, John William, The Lindeseie and Limesi Families of Great Britain including the Probates at Somerset House, London, England, of all Spellings of the Name Lindeseie from 1300-1800, Volume I, Privately Printed, Boston, Massachusetts, 1917, pp. 149–51

References

Anglo-Normans